The 2012 CONCACAF Champions League Final was the final of the 2011–12 CONCACAF Champions League, the 4th edition of the CONCACAF Champions League under its current format, and overall the 47th edition of the premium football club competition organized by CONCACAF, the regional governing body of North America, Central America, and the Caribbean.

The final was contested in a two-leg aggregate format on April 18 and 25, 2012, between two Mexican teams, Monterrey and Santos Laguna. After winning the first leg 2–0, a 2–1 loss in the second leg gave Monterrey the title 3–2 on aggregate. As a result, Monterrey earned the right to represent CONCACAF at the 2012 FIFA Club World Cup, entering at the quarterfinal stage.

Background
For the third time in four seasons of the CONCACAF Champions League, the final was played between two Mexican sides. This guaranteed a Mexican champion for the seventh straight year and 28th time since the confederation began staging the tournament in 1962 (including the tournament's predecessor, the CONCACAF Champions' Cup).

Monterrey were the defending champions, winning the title in 2010–11 after beating Real Salt Lake in the final. They defeated two Mexican sides in the knockout round.

Santos Laguna's previous best record was in 2008–09 when they reached the semifinals. Santos Laguna defeated two teams from Major League Soccer in the knockout round, scoring 6 goals in each of the two home victories.

Both teams qualified for the CONCACAF Champions League tournament by reaching the final of the Torneo Apertura 2010 in which Monterrey won with a score of 5–3.

Road to the final

Rules
Like other match-ups in the knockout round, the teams played two games, one at each team's home stadium. If the teams remained tied after 90 minutes of play during the 2nd leg, the away goals rule would be used, but not after a tie enters extra time, and so a tie would be decided by penalty shootout if the aggregate score is level after extra time.

Final summary

First leg

Second leg

References

External links
CONCACAF Champions League official website

Finals
2011–12 in Mexican football
Santos Laguna matches
C.F. Monterrey matches
International club association football competitions hosted by Mexico
CONCACAF Champions League finals